Strydom may refer to:

Amanda Strydom (born 1956), South African singer and songwriter
Barend Strydom, convicted 1988 spree killer who was sentenced to death in South Africa
Gary Strydom (born 1960), American IFBB professional bodybuilder
Gerhard Strydom (born 1979), South African first class cricketer for South Western Districts
Gregory Strydom (born 1984), Zimbabwean cricketer
Hannes Strydom (born July 1965), former South African rugby union player
Hanri Strydom (born 1980), international cricketer who played for South Africa national women's cricket team
Justin Strydom (born 1973), South African actor, writer and producer
Maria Strydom (mountain climber who died in 2016 climbing Mt Everest)
Ockie Strydom (born 1985), South African professional golfer
Pieter Strydom (born 1969), former cricketer
Popeye Strydom (1932–2001), South African rugby union player
Reinhardt Strydom (born 1977), South African-born Irish cricketer
William Strydom (1942–1995), South African first-class cricketer

See also
Johannes Gerhardus Strijdom
Vickus Strijdom

Afrikaans-language surnames
Surnames of Dutch origin